"All I Want for Christmas Is You" is a 1994 song by Mariah Carey.

All I Want for Christmas Is You may also refer to:

"All I Want for Christmas Is You" (Vince Vance & The Valiants song), 1989
 "All I Want For Christmas Is You, A Night of Joy & Festivity," a residency show by Mariah Carey
 All I Want for Christmas Is You (film), a 2017 film based on the Carey song
 "All I Want for Christmas Is You", a 1966 song by Carla Thomas
 "All I Want for Christmas Is You", a Sesame Street song by Big Bird from Elmo Saves Christmas
 "A Christmas Love Song" (music by Johnny Mandel, lyrics by Alan Bergman and Marilyn Bergman). The first line, "All I Want for Christmas Is You," is sometimes incorrectly given as the title

See also 
 All I Want for Christmas (disambiguation)